Carlos Crassus (6 August 1920 – 5 February 1984) was a Venezuelan sports shooter. He competed at the 1956 Summer Olympics and the 1960 Summer Olympics.

References

1920 births
1984 deaths
Venezuelan male sport shooters
Olympic shooters of Venezuela
Shooters at the 1956 Summer Olympics
Shooters at the 1960 Summer Olympics
Sportspeople from Caracas
Pan American Games medalists in shooting
Pan American Games silver medalists for Venezuela
Shooters at the 1959 Pan American Games
20th-century Venezuelan people